Thomas Farrar  was Archdeacon of Berbice from 1884 until his death in 1893.

He was then Rector of Demerara until his appointment as Archdeacon.

His son Walter was also a clergyman of the Caribbean region, as well as England.

References

19th-century Guyanese Anglican priests
1893 deaths
Archdeacons of Berbice